A History of My Brief Body is an autobiographical series of essays by Billy-Ray Belcourt, published July 14, 2020 by Penguin Canada.

Reception 
A History of My Brief Body received starred reviews from Kirkus Reviews, and Quill & Quire, as well as positive reviews from Rabble.ca, Full Stop, Cloud Literary, The Washington Post, The Rumpus, Booklist, and The Nerd Daily.

Kirkus Reviews, CBC, The Globe and Mail, and Largehearted Boy named the book one of the best of the year, and Book Riot and The Globe and Mail included it on other reading lists.

The book also received the following accolades:

 Lambda Literary Award for Gay Memoir/Biography finalist (2021)
 Hubert Evans Non-Fiction Prize winner (2021)
 Governor General's Literary Award for Nonfiction finalist (2020)
 Jim Deva Prize for Writing that Provokes finalist (2021)

References

External links 

 47 works of Canadian nonfiction coming out in fall 2020
 The CBC Books fall 2020 reading list: 40 Canadian books to check out this season

2020 non-fiction books
Canadian essay collections
LGBT autobiographies
Penguin Books books
LGBT literature in Canada
2020s LGBT literature